Miss Bonaparte (French: Mam'zelle Bonaparte) is a 1942 French historical drama film directed by Maurice Tourneur and starring Edwige Feuillère, Monique Joyce and Raymond Rouleau. It is based on a novel by Gérard Bourgeois and Pierre Chanlain, set during the reign of Napoleon III. The film was made during the German occupation of France.

The film's sets were designed by the art director Guy de Gastyne.

Cast
 Edwige Feuillère as Cora Pearl 
 Monique Joyce as Lucy de Kaula 
 Raymond Rouleau as Philippe de Vaudrey 
 Guillaume de Sax as Le prince Jérôme Bonaparte 
 Simone Renant as Adèle Rémy 
 Marguerite Pierry as La Blandin 
 Nina Sinclair as Augustine 
 Aimé Clariond as Le duc de Morny 
 Roland Armontel as Arsène 
 Noël Roquevert as Criscelli 
 Jacques Maury as Le comte de Brimont 
 Camille Bert as Le gouverneur du fort 
 André Carnège as Alexandre Dumas

References

Bibliography
 Waldman, Harry. Maurice Tourneur: The Life and Films. McFarland & Co, 2008.

External links

1942 films
1940s French-language films
Films directed by Maurice Tourneur
Films based on French novels
French historical drama films
1940s historical drama films
Films set in the 19th century
French black-and-white films
1942 drama films
Tobis Film films
Continental Films films
1940s French films